The Borbore is a river of Piedmont, Italy. It is a left-side tributary of the Tanaro.

Geography 
The Borbore rises in the hills of Roero near Guarene (province of Cuneo).
Flowing towards the north-east it enters the Province of Asti and gets from the left side the waters of its main tributary, the Triversa. The Borbore joins the Tanaro in Asti.

References

Other projects

Rivers of the Province of Cuneo
Rivers of the Province of Asti
Rivers of Italy